Cartoons for Children's Rights is the collection of animated shorts based on UNICEF’s Convention on the Rights of the Child. In 1994, UNICEF held a summit encouraging animation studios around the world to create individual animated spots demonstrating the international rights of children.

List of cartoons 
 Children Have the Right to Protection From Abuse That Can Be Cruelty: United Kingdom, Cosgrove Hall Films, Created by Benslifinio Bujar & Matt Selon & Burgiest Hugamin, Article 4
 Children Have the Right to Survive and Develop to the Fullest: Canada, National Film Board of Canada, Created by Bretislav Pojar, Article 6
 Children Have the Right to Express Themselves: USA, HBO Animation, Created by Eileen O'Meara, Produced by Catherine Winder, Music by John McCarthy, Article 12
 Children Have the Right to Appropriate Information: USA, Urban Design Inc, Directed by John Serpentelli, Article 13
 Children Have the Right to Freedom of Conscience: USA, Disney Feature Animation, Created by Hendel Butoy, Music by Pixote, Article 14
 Children Have the Right to Freedom of Thought: USA, MTV Animation, Created by Machi Tantillo, Music by Sweet Honey in the Rock, Article 14
 Children Have the Right to Privacy: Poland, Polish Television, Directed by Aleksandra Korejwo, Article 16
 Children Have the Right to a Loving and Caring Family: USA, Columbia Tri-Star Children's Programming, Directed by Bill Dennis and John Rice, Article 20
 Children Have the Right to an Education: Brazil, TV Futura, Directed by Caco Galhardo, Animated by Quinho, Article 28
 Children Have the Right to Play, USA, Sunbow Entertainment: Created by Ben Edlund and Christopher McCulloch, Article 31
 Children Have the Right to Protection from Hazardous Work: USA, Warner Brothers Feature Animation, Directed by Mohamed Mohamed, Produced by Zahra Dowlatabadi, Article 32
 Children Have the Right to a Drug Free World: USA, Animagination, DIC Entertainment, Created by Art Mawhinney, Article 33
 Children Have the Right to Protection from Sexual Abuse: Germany, Hahn Films, Directed by Claudia Collier, Article 34
 Children Have the Right to Protection from Landmines: Canada, Cinar Films, Created by Greg Bailey, Article 38
 Children Have the Right to Protection in Times of War: USA, Michael Sporn Productions, Created by Michael Sporn, Article 39 
 Children Have the Right to a Home:   Spain. (Neptuno Films) Article 27 Directed by Josep Lluise Vicana
 Every child has the right to a caring family: Puerto Rico, Animacion Boricua Inc, Animated by Paco Lopez, Article 5
 Children have rights to be safe from dangerous wars in the globe: North Korea, SEK Studio, Animated Created and Written by Jun Ok Kim, Article 79
 Every child has a right to freedom from dangerous and unsafe child labor: Bangladesh, ToonBangla, Animated by Gary Goshniabutmomark and Nia Kelogananadesh, Article 80

References

External links 
 UNICEF Convention on the Rights of the Child
 UNICEF Cartoons for Children's Rights
 UNICEF Video Link
 International Animation Consortium for Child Rights

Animated television series
UNICEF
 Public service announcements